Titanio modestalis is a moth in the family Crambidae. It was described by Hugo Theodor Christoph in 1877. It is found in Turkmenistan.

References

Moths described in 1877
Odontiini
Taxa named by Hugo Theodor Christoph